Lethe creola, the creole pearly-eye, is a species of brush-footed butterfly in the family Nymphalidae. It is found it the United States from North Carolina and central Georgia west to eastern Oklahoma and eastern Texas. Some authorities include this species in the genus Enodia as Enodia creola.

The wingspan is 59–70 mm. Males have spotted forewings. The upperside is brown with patches of dark scales along the veins. The underside is tan for both males and females. Adults feed on sap, rotting fruit, carrion and dung.

The larvae feed on the leaves of Arundinaria tecta. They only feed at night and hide at the base of the host plant during the day. The species overwinters in the larval stage.

The MONA or Hodges number for Lethe creola is 4568.2.

References

Further reading

External links

 

creola
Articles created by Qbugbot
Butterflies described in 1897